Kameh Sofla (also Romanized as Kāmeh Soflá; also known as Kāmeh-ye Pā’īn, Kāmeh, and Kāmeh Pā’īn) is a village in Bala Velayat Rural District, in the Central District of Torbat-e Heydarieh County, Razavi Khorasan Province, Iran. At the 2006 census, its population was 352, in 107 families.

References 

Populated places in Torbat-e Heydarieh County